Internacionale Tirana FC is an Albanian football club based in Tiranë. Part of the International University of Tirana, it is currently not competing in the senior football league.

References

Football clubs in Albania
Association football clubs established in 2013
Football clubs in Tirana